Yahya Al-Qarni (born 4 May 1998) is a Saudi Arabian professional footballer who plays as an midfielder for Al-Batin.

Career
On 21 July 2022, Al-Qarni joined Pro League side Al-Batin on a two-year deal from Al-Jabalain.

References

External links
 

1998 births
Living people
Association football midfielders
Saudi Arabian footballers
Saudi First Division League players
Saudi Professional League players
Al-Ahli Saudi FC players
Ohod Club players
Al-Jabalain FC players
Al Batin FC players